Charalambos "Chambos" Kyriakou (born 9 February 1995) is a Cypriot footballer who plays as a midfielder for Apollon Limassol and the Cyprus national team.

International career
Kyriakou made his debut with the Cyprus national football team on 5 March 2014 in a friendly match against Northern Ireland when he replaced Vincent Laban in the 67th minute.

Career statistics

Club

International

References

External links
 
 
 

1995 births
Living people
Cypriot footballers
Cyprus international footballers
Cyprus under-21 international footballers
Cyprus youth international footballers
Cypriot First Division players
Apollon Limassol FC players
G.D. Estoril Praia players
Primeira Liga players
Cypriot expatriate footballers
Expatriate footballers in Portugal
Association football midfielders